Mutara I Nsoro II Semugeshi was Mwami of the Kingdom of Rwanda during the sixteenth century.

15th-century monarchs in Africa
Rwandan kings